HMS Ettrick was a  that fought for the Royal Navy and the Royal Canadian Navy during the Second World War. The vessel primarily saw action in the Battle of the Atlantic as a convoy escort. The ship was named for the Ettrick Water in Scotland.

Ettrick was ordered 1 June 1941 as part of the River-class building programme. The vessel was laid down on 31 December 1941 by John Crown & Sons at Sunderland and launched 25 February 1943. The ship was one of six frigates of the class to be fitted with steam turbines instead of the standard reciprocating machinery. She was commissioned into the Royal Navy on 11 July 1943.

War service

Royal Navy
After commissioning and trials, Ettrick was assigned to the Mid-Ocean Escort Force (MOEF) as a convoy escort. From Dec 1943 to Mar 1944, she was commanded by Lt Cdr Nicholas Monsarrat, who later depicted her as "HMS River" in his 1946 novel H. M. Frigate.  The ship was initially assigned to escort group C-1, a Canadian-commanded group. In January 1944 she put in at Halifax, Nova Scotia to undergo a refit. While there she was turned over to the Royal Canadian Navy.

Royal Canadian Navy
On 29 January 1944, while undergoing a refit at Halifax, Ettrick was commissioned into the Royal Canadian Navy. Once the refit was completed, the vessel was assigned to MOEF escort group C-3. She made two round trips to Derry with the group before transferring out to join escort group 27 based out of Halifax. On 14 January 1945, she rammed  during the defence of convoy BX 141, damaging the submarine's conning tower. The submarine however was able to escape.  The ship remained as a local escort until the end of hostilities in Europe. She returned to the United Kingdom in May and was returned to the Royal Navy on 30 May 1945.

Postwar service
Following the vessel's return to the Royal Navy, she was converted to a combined operations headquarters ship. The ship however was never recommissioned into the fleet and saw no service in her new capability. In April 1946 Ettrick was laid up at Harwich. The vessel was broken up in 1953 at Grays.

References

Notes

Footnotes

Sources
 Macpherson, Ken; Barrie, Ron. (2002) Warships of Canada's Naval Forces 1910–2002. 3rd Edition. St. Catharines: Vanwell Publishing Limited. 

 

Ships of the Royal Canadian Navy
1943 ships
Ships built on the River Wear
River-class frigates of the Royal Navy